The 2012–13 season was Coventry City's 93rd season in The Football League and their first season in Football League One following relegation from the Football League Championship. In addition to League One, the Sky Blues also entered the League Cup, the FA Cup and the Football League Trophy in the first rounds.

Review and events

Monthly events
This is a list of the significant events to occur at the club during the 2012–13 season, presented in chronological order. This list does not include transfers, which are listed in the transfers section below, or match results, which are in the results section.

June:
 7 – The kit for the forthcoming season is revealed.
 14 – Coventry City draw Dagenham & Redbridge away in the League Cup First Round.
 18 – Coventry City's fixtures for the 2012–13 Football League One season are announced
 18 – Assistant Manager Steve Harrison leaves Coventry City by mutual consent, due to cost-cutting measures.
 20 – Coventry City have transfer embargo lifted after filling accounts and The Football League sign off.
 26 – Coventry City's sixth game of the season against Stevenage will be shown live on Sky Sports on 9 September.
 28 – Coventry City appoint former player Richard Shaw as Assistant Manager.

July:
 1 – Andy Thorn called the players back for training a week early then planned to get the squad ready for the 2012–13 season.
 23 – Former Coventry City midfielder Ernie Machin died at the age of 68.
 30 – Squad numbers were released for the forthcoming season.
 31 – Coventry City are placed in the Northern Section East for the First Round of the Football League Trophy.

August:
 15 – Coventry City draw Birmingham City at home in the League Cup Second Round.
 16 – Kevin Kilbane is named new club captain for the 2012–13 season, taking over from Sammy Clingan.
 16 – Jordan Clarke signed a new contract until 2014, with an option for a further year.
 18 – Coventry City draw Burton Albion at home in the Football League Trophy First Round.
 18 – 2012–13 League One season kicks off.
 26 – Manager Andy Thorn is relieved of managerial duties with immediate effect.
 26 – Assistant Manager Richard Shaw and First Team Coach Lee Carsley are placed in caretaker charge of first team duties.
 28 – Carl Baker is named in the Official Football League League One team of the week, following his performance against Bury.
 30 – Coventry City draw Arsenal away in the League Cup Third Round.

September:
 8 – Coventry City draw York City away in the Football League Trophy Second Round.
 19 – Mark Robins is appointed as new Coventry City manager, signing a three-year contract.
 21 – SISU and The Alan Higgs Trust reach an initial agreement concerning Coventry City buying 50% of the Ricoh Arena.
 21 – Coventry City appoint Steve Taylor as First Team Coach.

October:
 2 – Joe Murphy and Reece Brown are named in the Official Football League League One team of the week, following their performances against Oldham Athletic.
 8 – Joe Murphy is named in the Official Football League League One team of the week, following his clean sheet performance against AFC Bournemouth.
 13 – Coventry City draw Sheffield United or Notts County at home in the Football League Trophy Northern section quarter-final.
 16 – David McGoldrick is named in the Official Football League League One team of the week, following his performance against Swindon Town, where he scored two goals.
 16 – Richard Shaw leaves Coventry City after change to the management structure. Shaw left with immediate effect.
 16 – Coventry City welcome former physio Dave Hart back to the Ricoh Arena as Mark Robins strengthens his backroom staff as part of a restructuring programme.
 21 – Coventry City draw Arlesey Town at home in the FA Cup First Round.
 29 – Cyrus Christie and David McGoldrick are named in the Official Football League League One team of the week, following their performance against Leyton Orient.
 30 – Coventry City striker David McGoldrick had the third Coventry City goal against York City in the Johnstone's Paint Trophy rewarded to him by the Football League.

November:
 4 – Coventry City draw Morecambe or Rochdale at home in the FA Cup Second Round.
 20 – Carl Baker is named in the Official Football League League One team of the week.

December:
 2 – Coventry City draw Tottenham Hotspur away in the FA Cup Third Round.
 8 – Coventry City midfielder Kevin Kilbane announced his retirement from professional football.
 8 – Coventry City draw Bury or Preston North End in the Football League Trophy Area Semi-Final.
 10 – Cyrus Christie, Carl Baker and David McGoldrick were named in the Official Football League League One team of the week, following the performance against Walsall.
 12 – Coventry City's Football League Trophy regional semi-final will be shown live on Sky Sports.
 17 – Coventry City's David McGoldrick is named in the Official Football League League One team of the week.
 18 – David McGoldrick has been awarded the PFA Fans' Player of the Month award for November.
 31 – Stephen Elliott is named in the Official Football League League One team of the week.

January:
 11 – Coventry City have been drawn to play at home first in the two-legged tie in the Football League Trophy against either Crewe Alexandra or Bradford City
 11 – Mark Robins was named manager of the month for December.
 11 – David McGoldrick was named player of the month for December.
 22 – James Bailey and Gary McSheffrey are named in the Official Football League League One team of the week.

February:
 4 – Leon Clarke was named in the Official Football League League One team of the week after scoring 2 goals in his performance against Sheffield United.
 14 – Manager Mark Robins leaves Coventry City, along with coach Steve Taylor, after being announced as the new boss of Huddersfield Town.
 18 – Joe Murphy and Carl Baker were named in the Official Football League League One team of the week following their performances against Bury.

March:
 1 – Club placed under transfer embargo for failing to file accounts.
 4 – Deputy Chairman John Clarke resigned from Coventry City Football Club's Board.
 6 – Coventry City were granted permission to speak to Falkirk manager Steven Pressley about the vacant managerial position.
 8 – Steven Pressley was unveiled as the new Coventry City manager.
 11 – Leon Clarke was named in the Official Football League League One team of the week following his performance against Scunthorpe United.
 20 – Cyrus Christie was named in the Official Football League League One team of the week following his performance versus Hartlepool United/
 21 – SISU place non-operating subsidiary Coventry City Football Club Ltd into administration.
 23 – All Coventry City staff based at Ricoh Arena are moved out and club shop stock removed.
 28 – Leon Clarke and Carl Baker were named in the Official Football League League One top 10 players of the 2012–13 season.
 28 – An agreement is made between SISU and ACL for remaining 3 league games to be played at Ricoh Arena.
 28 – Coventry City are deducted 10 points by the Football League for entering administration.

April
 4 – Cyrus Christie is named in the Official Football League League One team of the week, following his performance against Doncaster Rovers.
 4 – Coventry City Football Club (Holdings) Ltd appeal against the 10 points deduction against them.
 8 – Carl Baker is named in the Official Football League League One team of the week, following his performance against Brentford.
 10 – Coventry City Football Club (Holdings) Ltd withdraw the appeal against the 10 points deduction against them.
10 – Coventry City youngsters Cian Harries and George Thomas are called up to the Wales Under-16 squad for the matches in the UEFA Development Tournament.
12 – Cian Harries and George Thomas play in 2–0 win for Wales Under-16 against Northern Ireland Under-16.
13 – George Thomas plays in 1–1 draw for Wales Under-16 against Faroe Islands Under-16.
14 – Cian Harries and George Thomas play in 2–0 win for Wales Under-16 against Iceland Under-16.

Squad details

Players info

Matches

Preseason friendlies

League One

League Cup

FA Cup

Football League Trophy

League One

League table

Results summary

Round by round

* 10 points were deducted from Coventry City's league total prior to the playing of the round 41 match.

Scores overview

Season statistics

Starts and goals

|-
|colspan="14"|Players played for Coventry this season who left before the season ended or retired:

Goalscorers

Assists

Yellow cards

Red cards

Captains

Penalties awarded

Suspensions served

Monthly and weekly awards

CBS Goal of the Month

End-of-season awards

International appearances

Overall

Transfers

Transfers in

Transfers out

Loans in

Loans out

Trials

References

External links
 Official Site: 2012–13
 BBC Sport – Club Stats
 Soccerbase – Results | Squad Stats | Transfers

Coventry City
Coventry City F.C. seasons